This is a list of all the United States Supreme Court cases from volume 387 of the United States Reports:

External links

1967 in United States case law